Aliabad-e Qeshlaq (also Romanized as ‘Alīābād-e Qeshlāq; also known as Qeshlāq-e Gūrān) is a village in Gavdul-e Markazi Rural District, in the Central District of Malekan County, East Azerbaijan Province, Iran. At the 2006 census, its population was 981, in 259 families.

References 

Populated places in Malekan County